Asahito Nanjo (南條麻人) is a Japanese underground musician, best known for his psychedelic rock groups High Rise, Mainliner and Musica Transonic, and the ethnic improvisation unit Toho Sara. He has been active on the Tokyo underground scene since the late seventies.

Part of his sonic aesthetic is to record, mix, and master using extreme levels of distortion, dynamic range compression, and clipping making the sound of the instruments unrecognizable.  The results can be said to contain elements of noise music.

Musical activity 

Below are the main groups with which he has been involved from 1979 to the present:

 Red Alert	(psychedelic punk group, 79–81)
 Red		(experimental performance, 79–89)
 Conformist	(dark psychedelic group, 81–82)
 Deaf and Dumb House	(esthetic improvisation unit, 81–82)
 Virus Freak	(avant-garde free rock group, 81–82)
 Tako		(avant-garde performance group, 81–82)
 I'm useless	(strange free rock unit centring on Tamio Shiraishi, 81–82)
 Telepatys going bad of Rotness	(psychedelic punk group, 81–82)
 Kousokuya	(psychedelic avant-garde group, 82–83)
 Sweet Inspirations	(progenitor of Maher Shalal Hash Baz, 83–84)
 Psychedelic Speed Freaks	(the ur-High Rise, 83–84)
 High Rise	(heavy psychedelic group, 84 - present)
 Shokubaiya	(improvised music unit, 88–89)
 Nijiumu	(improv unit formed with Keiji Haino, 88–90)
 Ohkami no Jikan	(dark psychedelic group, 90 - present)
 Ten no Okami	(avant-garde unit, with Keiji Haino, 90–91)
 Johari	(ethnic meets experimental, 90–92)
 Toho Sara	(avant-garde shamanism, 92- present)
 Group Musica	(avant-garde symphonic group, 94 - present)
 Bibliotheca Hermetica	(avant-garde, 94 - present)
 Mysterious Adni	(avant-garde, 94 - present)
 Ancient Wisdom	(avant-garde, 94 - present)
 Splendour Solis	(avant-garde, 94 - present)
 Up Tight		(free jazz unit, 94 - present)
 Musica Transonic	(psychedelic improvised music, 94 - present)
 Mainliner		(heavy psychedelic noise rock group, 95 - present)
 Psychedelic Background	(trip psychedelic group, 96 - present)
 Minus Three Years Old	(new psychedelic blues band, with Keiji Haino, 96 - present)

Discography
Nanjo is credited on over 300 releases.

Selected discography:

High Rise 
see High Rise (band) for full discography

on P.S.F label if not specified
II (1986) 
Dispersion (1992)
Disallow (1996)
Psychedelic Speed Freaks '84-'85 (1997, Time Bomb)
Desperado (1998)

Mainliner 
see Mainliner (band) for full discography

Mellow Out (1996)
Imaginative Plain (2001)

References

Interview. Opprobrium, issue 3, 1998. (English)

Stofer, F. (2000). Japanese Independent Music, France: Sonore.

External links
High Rise official website
Interview with Nanjo

High Rise (band) members
Japanese male musicians
Japanese musicians
Living people
Mainliner (band) members
Year of birth missing (living people)